Berlin Central School District (BCSD) is a rural public school district located in the eastern part of Rensselaer County, New York and borders the Commonwealth of Massachusetts. The district has two operating school buildings: one elementary school and one middle school/high school building. The district is a member of the Rensselaer-Columbia-Greene Board of Cooperative Educational Services (BOCES), known as Questar III.

Geography

The district serves five towns in Rensselaer County: Berlin, Grafton, Petersburgh, Poestenkill, and Stephentown.

Administration

Board of Education
The Board of Education (BOE) is the authoritative legislative body of the school district.  It approves policy and funding; sets committees and district priorities; and approves employment (including the Superintendent) within the district, among other things. The BOE is made up of seven members:
Frank Zwack-President
Gina Goodermote-Vice President
Katie Fiske
Rachel Finney
Elizabeth Miller
Jeff Paine
Jim Willis

Superintendent
The Superintendent is Stephen Young. The Superintendent is the Chief Administrative Officer of the district and is responsible for the day-to-day operations of the district in addition to administering policies of the Board.

Schools
The district is currently served by one elementary school: Berlin Elementary School.  Berlin Junior/Senior High School is the lone upper level building. There are three principals in the district: one for the elementary, one for the middle school and one for the high school.

See also

Education-related
New York State Education Department
University of the State of New York
Regents Examinations
Board of Cooperative Educational Services (BOCES)
List of school districts in New York
New York State School Boards Association
National School Boards Association
No Child Left Behind Act

Notes and references

School districts in New York (state)
Education in Rensselaer County, New York